is a Japanese television drama series and the 105th NHK Asadora series, following Okaeri Mone. It premiered on November 1, 2021 and concluded on April 8, 2022. The story is about 100 years-old family, three generations, Yasuko (grandmother), Rui (mother), and Hinata (daughter) who worked with a radio English course during the Shōwa, Heisei, and Reiwa eras. The drama is set in Okayama, Osaka and Kyoto.

Plot 
The story is about a three-generation family, Yasuko (grandmother), Rui (mother) and Hinata (daughter) who worked with a radio English course during the Shōwa, Heisei, and Reiwa eras. While facing the challenges of the Shōwa, Heisei, and Reiwa eras, the three find their own way of life in love, work, and marriage. The story unfolds in a heroine relay system.

Yasuko Tachibana was born in Okayama City in 1925, the year when Japan began radio broadcasts. Yasuko grew up in a warm family who owns a Japanese sweets shop in the shopping district of Okayama city. Her family wished her to inherit the shop but war changed her fate. Her story is Japanese sweets and baseball-themed.

Yasuko's daughter, Rui's story begins in Osaka in 1955 with jazz as its theme. Rui separates from her mother for some reason and opens the way to live under her own will and power, even though she is hurt and lost. Rui hates her mother and English.

Meanwhile the story of Hinata, Rui's daughter and Yasuko's granddaughter, sets off in Kyoto in 1965 as a historical drama. Unlike her grandmother, Hinata was born in a peaceful time, and is a sweetheart. Hinata is a little useless but she plays an important role in this three-generation family story.

Cast

Heroines 

 Mone Kamishiraishi as Yasuko Tachibana / Yasuko Kijima 
Ibuki Amimoto as young Yasuko
Ryoko Moriyama as old Yasuko, also known as Annie Hirakawa
 Eri Fukatsu as Rui Kijima, Yasuko's daughter
Misaki Nakano as young Rui (from age three to five)
Rin Furukawa as young Rui (age seven)
 Rina Kawaei as Hinata Otsuki, Rui's daughter and Yasuko's granddaughter
Chise Niitsu as young Hinata

Tachibana Family 

 Masahiro Kōmoto as Kinta Tachibana, Yasuko's father
 Naomi Nishida as Koshizu Tachibana, Yasuko's mother
 Gaku Hamada as Santa Tachibana, Yasuko's older brother
 Shinya Owada as Kinetarō Tachibana, Yasuko's grandfather
 Machiko Washio as Hisa Tachibana, Yasuko's grandmother

Kijima Family 

 Yasunori Danta as Senkichi Kijima
 YOU as Midori Kijima, Senkichi's wife
 Hokuto Matsumura as Minoru Kijima, Senkichi's elder son / Yasuko's husband
 Nijiro Murakami as Isamu Kijima, Senkichi's younger son / Yasuko's friend
Yūki Meguro as old Isamu Kijima
 Yui Okada as Yukie, Kijima family's helper
Yumi Takigawa as old Yukie
 Kanoko Nishikawa as Tami Murano, Kijima family's helper

People from Shopping Street 

 Karin Ono as Kinu Mizuta, Yasuko's friend
 Goe Asagoe as Uhei Mizuta, the owner of Mizutaya tofu shop
 Megumi Komaki as Hanako Mizuta, Uhei's wife
 Keisuke Horibe as Kichibee Akanishi, the owner of Akanishi hardware shop, and adult Kichiemon.
 Mai Miyajima as Kiyoko Akanishi, Kichibee's wife
 Chieko Matsubara as old Kiyoko
 Seiichiro Nakagawa as Kichiemon Akanishi, Kichibee's son
 Yūki Tokunaga as Kichinojō Akanishi, Kichibee's grandson
 Masanori Sera as Teiichi Yanagisawa, the owner of Dippermouth Blues cafe
 Tomoya Maeno as Kenichi Yanagisawa, Teiichi's son
 Oideyasu Oda as Shinpei Morioka

Others from Okayama 

 Masashi Sada as Tadaichi Hirakawa, an English radio lecturer
 Tatsumasa Murasame as Robert Rosewood, an Expeditionary Army Officer / American man who loves Yasuko
 Mahiru Konno as Sumiko Ogawa, a housewife
 Yuu Tokui as Kowamote no Tanaka, a debt collector
 Midori Wakai as Ogura Kuma, a Minoru's Boarding House landlord
 Sō Takei as Kanda Takeshi, an imperial soldier

People in Osaka 

 Joe Odagiri as Joichiro "Joe" Otsuki, Rui's husband
 Mikako Ichikawa as Ichiko "Berry" Noda, a female customer at Jazz cafe
 Tōko Miura as Ichie Noda, Ichiko's daughter
 Taichi Saotome as Kitazawa ”Tommy” Tomio, a musician
 Takehiro Murata as Heisuke Takemura, the owner of Takemura Cleaning Shop
 Mari Hamada as Kazuko Takemura, Heisuke's wife
 Yoshimasa Kondo as Yosuke Kogure, a bartender and owner of Jazz cafe
 Shohei Shofukutei as Futoshi Nishiyama

Others 

 Onoe Kikunosuke V as Kennosuke Momoyama I, a movie star, and Kennosuke Momoyama II
 Kanata Hongō as Bunshirō Igarashi
 Yua Shinkawa as Sayoko Fujii, Hinata's friend

Production 
This is the first time in the history of a serial television novel that three actresses play the three main characters as different heroines. The heroine baton will be passed down to the next generation in a relay system.

The title Come Come Everybody is the title of the opening song of the NHK Radio English course, commonly known as "kamu kamu eigo" by Tadaichi Hirakawa, that once dominated Japan immediately after the end of the war. When the lyrics "Come come everybody" and the melody of the Japanese children's song "Shojoji no Tanukibayashi" started, children and elderly people all over Japan were hooked and encouraged by the cheerful voice. It conveyed Hirakawa's desire to "brighten" the dark postwar Japan. The title was made with the wish that the slogan "Come Come Everybody" would be a power word to open up the future to live in the present.

Mone Kamishiraishi and Rina Kawaei were selected as heroines through an audition which received 3061 applicants. Eri Fukatsu was chosen by NHK. This is Mone Kamishiraishi and Eri Fukatsu's first appearance in an asadora. Rina Kawaei already appeared in the asadora Toto Neechan (2016).

On July 21, 2021, it was announced that the broadcast would start on November 1, 2021. On September 27, it was announced that the theme song for Come Come Everybody would be "Aldebaran", a song recorded by Japanese-American singer-songwriter Ai that was released on November 1, 2021. The song, written Naotarō Moriyama features arrangements by Neko Saito and was produced by Ai and Saito. The song originally was about environmental issues and was titled "Daphnia Pulex". "Aldebaran" was not intended to be the theme song for Come Come Everybody until Moriyama allowed Ai to record the song with reworked lyrics. "Aldebaran" was later included on Dream, Ai's twelfth studio album. 

On October 7, 2021, the main poster of the drama was released. The poster photo was taken by photographer Takehide Niitsubo. The theme of the three heroines is "Family Tree", and it is expressed through an image of a family photo that transcends three generations of parents and children.

TV schedule

Awards and nominations

References

External links 

 Official website (in Japanese)

2021 Japanese television series debuts
Asadora